The 2020–21 American Eagles men's basketball team represented American University in the 2020–21 NCAA Division I men's basketball season. The Eagles, led by eighth-year head coach Mike Brennan, will play their home games at Bender Arena in Washington, D.C. as members of the Patriot League. With the creation of mini-divisions to cut down on travel due to the COVID-19 pandemic, they will play in the South Division.

Previous season
The Eagles finished the 2019–20 season 16–14, 12–6 in Patriot League play to finish in a tie for second place. They lost in the quarterfinals of the Patriot League tournament to Bucknell.

Roster

Schedule and results

|-
!colspan=9 style=| Patriot League regular season

|-
!colspan=12 style=| Patriot League tournament
|-

|-

Source

References

American Eagles men's basketball seasons
American Eagles
American Eagles men's basketball
American Eagles men's basketball